Eranina fulveola is a species of beetle in the family Cerambycidae. It was described by Bates in 1881. It is known from Panama and Guatemala.

References

Eranina
Beetles described in 1881